The cendrawasih dance is a Balinese dance which is performed by two female dancers and illustrates the mating rituals of the bird of paradise (burung cendrawasih in Indonesian).

History
A dance known as cendrawasih was designed by I Gde Manik and was first performed in the Sawan subdistrict of the Buleleng Regency in the 1920s; the area is the origin of numerous dances, including Trunajaya, Wirangjaya, and Palawakya. However, this version was significantly different from the dance that is now commonly performed.

Present-day performances of the cendrawasih dance originate from choreography by  Wijaya Bandem, who arranged for the first performance in 1988. The cendrawasih dance is inspired by the bird of paradise, which is known as burung cendrawasih in Indonesian and as manuk dewata ("the bird of the gods") in Balinese. This genus of bird is known to dance and sing when attempting to attract a mate. The cendrawasih dance is one of several Balinese dances inspired by birds; others include the Manuk Rawa and Belibis dances.

Choreographers of individual performances are allowed to include their own interpretations. The cendrawasih dance is often performed outside of Indonesia when promoting Indonesian culture, such as in Peru in 2002, at the Freer Gallery of Art in Washington, D.C., in 2008, Japan in 2008, and the Netherlands in 2008.

A 2014 study found that a single performance of the cendrawasih dance could burn 40 calories, or 5 calories per minute of dancing, with dancers' heart rates reaching an average of 157 beats per minute. Thus, the researchers classified a mild-intensity aerobic exercise.

Performance
The dance is performed by two women, one portraying a male bird of paradise, and one portraying a female; the dance takes the form of a mating ritual. The dancers are dressed in Pandji-style headdresses with feathers stuck in them, as well as long flowing scarves or skirts with a pink stripe. The skirts serve as the colourful tails of the birds of paradise, and when held give the impression of wings. The fluttering of the skirts when running give an impression of flight.

Many of the movements are not present in other Balinese dance forms. For instance, dancers use their trailing costumes to symbolize the wings of the birds of paradise, and may stand en pointe. The two dancers flutter about, as if flirting.

See also

 Barong
 Balinese dance
 Kebagh dance
 Dance in Indonesia

References

Works cited

 

Dances of Bali
Birds in popular culture